Scottdale is a borough in Westmoreland County, Pennsylvania, United States,  southeast of Pittsburgh.

Early in the 20th century, Scottdale was the center of the Frick coke interests. It had steel and iron pipe mills, brass and silver works, a casket factory, a large milk-pasteurizing plant, and machine shops; all of the aforementioned are presently defunct. Scottdale is notable for its economic decline from a formerly prosperous coke-town into an archetypal Rust Belt town. Duraloy Technologies, "a supplier of specialty high alloy, centrifugal and static cast components and assemblies" is the last remnant of Scottdale's steel related prosperity.

In 1900, 4,261 people lived in Scottdale; in 1910, the population increased to 5,456; and in 1940, 6,493 people lived in Scottdale. The population was 4,384 at the 2010 census. Scottdale is located in the Southmoreland School District.

History
It is difficult to identify when the first non-Indian settler arrived in what is now the Borough of Scottdale, although the area witnessed an influx of Scotch-Irish immigrants in the late 1770s. In the mid-19th century, part of the present-day townsite was the location of a distillery, flour mill and post office known as Fountain Mills.

The Pennsylvania Railroad and Baltimore and Ohio Railroad each built branch lines through the community in the early 1870s. With the coming of the railroads, the community’s economy shifted from agriculture to manufacturing and mining. Two brothers who were local farmers, Peter and Jacob Loucks, realized the impact the railroads could have on the area and laid out a small townsite consisting of 24 lots, which went on sale in 1872.

Scottdale was incorporated as a borough on February 5, 1874 and at that time named in honor of Thomas A. Scott, who had been president of the Pennsylvania Railroad and served as Assistant Secretary of War during the Civil War. Because Scottdale sits atop major coal deposits, the community flourished due to the surrounding coal mines, as well as ovens for converting coal into coke (fuel). The H. C. Frick Coke Company, controlled by Henry Clay Frick, was headquartered here. Scottdale’s factories in the early 20th century also produced iron pipe, tin, knives, steam engines, and caskets.

Scottdale has two sites on the National Register of Historic Places:  Scottdale Armory (1929) at 501 North Broadway Street,  and the Scottdale Historic District, which encompasses the oldest parts of the borough.

The oldest extant building in the borough is the Jacob Loucks House at 115 Walnut Avenue, built in 1853. Otherwise, the borough’s oldest residences are concentrated on Loucks Avenue, where many houses date from the 1880s. As well, three downtown retail buildings can be dated to approximately 1880: 101 Pittsburgh Street, 143 Pittsburgh Street, and 4-10 South Broadway Street.

The West Overton Museum in Scottdale is the only pre-Civil War village still intact today in Pennsylvania. It was named to the National Register of Historic Districts in 1985 as an outstanding example of a 19th-century rural industrial village complete with farm, two floors of the Overholt Mill/Distillery, industrial tools, Blacksmith Shop, a wash house and a smokehouse.  It is a stop on the American Whiskey Trail

Schools
Students who attend local school district are known as the "Scotties," a name that carried over when the Scottdale ("Scottdale Scotties") and East Huntington Township school districts merged to form Southmoreland School District.  The mascot is a Scottish Terrier.

Geography
Scottdale is located at  (40.102410, -79.591078).

Nearby cities: Pittsburgh (34.5 miles), Connellsville (6.0 miles), Dawson (6.0 miles), Everson (0.9 miles), Hunker (7.3 miles), Mount Pleasant (4.7 miles), New Stanton (8.2 miles), South Connellsville (7.2 miles), Vanderbilt (6.9 miles).

Surrounding neighborhoods
Scottdale has three borders, including East Huntingdon to the north, northwest and west and the Fayette County neighborhoods of Upper Tyrone Township from the east-northeast to the south and Everson to the south.

Demographics

As of the census of 2000, there were 4,772 people, 2,034 households, and 1,309 families residing in the borough. The population density was 4,094.9 people per square mile (1,574.8/km2). There were 2,214 housing units at an average density of 1,899.9 per square mile (730.6/km2). The racial makeup of the borough was 98.13% White, 1.11% African American, 0.10% Native American, 0.13% Asian, 0.06% Pacific Islander, 0.08% from other races, and 0.38% from two or more races. Hispanic or Latino of any race were 0.36% of the population.

There were 2,034 households, out of which 26.2% had children under the age of 18 living with them, 51.3% were married couples living together, 10.3% had a female householder with no husband present, and 35.6% were non-families. 32.7% of all households were made up of individuals, and 17.9% had someone living alone who was 65 years of age or older. The average household size was 2.31 and the average family size was 2.94.

In the borough the population was spread out, with 21.2% under the age of 18, 7.1% from 18 to 24, 26.5% from 25 to 44, 24.4% from 45 to 64, and 20.8% who were 65 years of age or older. The median age was 42 years. For every 100 females, there were 87.1 males. For every 100 females age 18 and over, there were 84.2 males.

The median income for a household in the borough was $32,000, and the median income for a family was $41,114. Males had a median income of $31,843 versus $22,143 for females. The per capita income for the borough was $17,994. About 5.2% of families and 8.3% of the population were below the poverty line, including 8.9% of those under age 18 and 7.8% of those age 65 or over.

Education Levels: High School or higher: 87.2%, Bachelor's Degree or higher: 18.3%, Graduate or Professional Degree: 6.2%

Ancestries: 35.7% German, 12% Polish, 11.8% Irish, 10.5% Italian, 10.3% English, 4.6% Scottish.

Scottdale's crime rate is less than 40% of the national average.

Notable people 
 Johnny Arthur (1883–1951), stage and film actor
 Leonard Goldenson (1905-1999), president of American Broadcasting Company from 1951-1986, whose leadership turned ABC into a major television network and media conglomerate.
 Jim Heise, baseball player
 Lillian Peacock (1889–1918), silent film actress
 Herbert Morrison (1905–1989), radio announcer, best known for his account of the Hindenburg disaster
 Jack Onslow, baseball player and manager
 D. J. Coffman (1976-_) comic book illustrator, cartoonist, best known for creating Hero By Night
 Chris Shipley (1962- ) technology industry analyst and commentator.
Pro Football Hall of Famer Russ Grimm (1959–Present)  three-time Super Bowl Champion with Washington Redskins, member of the famed "Hogs" offensive line. The Russ Grimm Football Field is named after him.

References

External links
 ScottdaleOnline
 Scottdale Chamber of Commerce

Boroughs in Westmoreland County, Pennsylvania
Populated places established in 1872
Pittsburgh metropolitan area
Scotch-Irish American culture in Pennsylvania
1872 establishments in Pennsylvania